ECI may refer to:

Companies
 ECI Partners, a British private equity group
 ECI Telecom, an Israeli telecommunication equipment manufacturer
 El Corte Inglés, a Spanish retailer
 Engine Components Inc., an American aircraft engine manufacturer
 Eze Castle Integration, an American IT company

Education
 Early childhood intervention, a support and educational system for very young children
 Eastwood Collegiate Institute, in Kitchener, Ontario, Canada
 Emergency care instructor, a person who provides training in emergency care
 Etobicoke Collegiate Institute, in Ontario, Canada

Government and politics
 Election Commission of India, a body established by the Constitution of India
 European Citizens' Initiative, in the European Union
 Evangelical Climate Initiative, in the United States

Indexes
 Economic Complexity Index, an economic indicator
 Efficiency of conversion, efficiency of food conversion, an index measure of food fuel efficiency in animals
 Employment cost index, in the United States

Science and technology
 Earth-centered inertial, a coordinate system
 Enhanced Cartridge Interface, a computer interface
 Enterprise content integration, a software technology
 Extended Channel Interpretation, a communication protocol extension for the bar code reader to host interface
 European Color Initiative, an expert group
  E-UTRAN Cell Identity (ECI), an identity for a cell within a network in LTE

Other uses
 Eastern Congo Initiative, an American development charity
 Engineering Council of India
 Evangelical Church of India
 World Federation of Energy, Chemical and Various Industry Workers' Unions, a former international trade union secretariat